Wingham Town railway station  was a railway station on the East Kent Light Railway, which served the village of Wingham. It opened in 1920 and closed to passenger traffic after the last train on 30 October 1948. There was a loop when the station first opened, but this was removed when the line was extended to the Canterbury Road station in 1925. Today the site of the station is occupied by a row of private garages and the village Scout Hut.

References

Sources

External links

Disused railway stations in Kent
Former East Kent Light Railway stations
Railway stations in Great Britain opened in 1920
Railway stations in Great Britain closed in 1948